Meteor-3M No.1 was the first and only of the Meteor-3M series polar-orbiting weather satellites. It was launched on 10 December 2001 at 17:18:57 UTC from the Baikonur Cosmodrome in Kazakhstan. The satellite is in a sun-synchronous orbit with an ascending node time of about 9AM.

Capabilities 
An APT transmission was planned to only have a reduced resolution (2 km) visible channel data. The status of any APT capability on this satellite was unclear, but it was thought not to have an APT transmitter. No APT transmissions were received from this satellite. SLR mission support began on 1 May 2002.

Secondary mission objective was the flight testing of the novel-type spherical retroreflector for precise laser ranging.

ILRS Mission Support Status 
SLR was used for precise orbit determination and retroreflector research.

Instrumentation 
 SAGE III
 Spherical retroreflector
 Other weather monitoring instruments

Retro-reflector Array (RRA) characteristics 
The retro-reflector was a glass ball 60 mm in diameter, fastened in a holder providing observation from Earth at elevations of more than 30° (the retroreflector field of view was centered in the Nadir direction). The spherical retro-reflector with its holder was fixed to the Meteor-3M No.1 spacecraft. The expected return signal strength level was between LAGEOS and ETALON.

SAGE III 
Meteor-3M No.1 included the SAGE III (Stratospheric Aerosol and Gas Experiment) payload and other instruments designed to measure temperature and humidity profiles, clouds, surface properties, and high energy particles in the upper atmosphere. SAGE III was a gyrating spectrometer that measured ultraviolet/visible light, which was used to enhance understanding of natural and human-derived atmospheric processes by providing accurate long-term measurements of the vertical structure of aerosols, ozone, water vapor, and other important trace gases in the upper troposphere and stratosphere.

End of mission 
Technical problems affecting the satellite two years after launch left it almost completely disabled. Meteor-3M No.1 functioned until March 2006, after which it was decommissioned. Meteor-M No.1, a replacement satellite, was launched on 17 September 2009.

See also

 Meteor

References

External links
 Sputnik server
 eoPortal Meteor overview
 SAGE III Meteor 3M
 SAGE III Meteor 3M platform
 NASA - Goddard Space Flight Center Scientific Visualization Studio
Spacecraft launched in 2001
Weather satellites of Russia